This article details events from the year 2005 in Belgium. Major events include the holding of the Junior Eurovision Song Contest in Belgium, and the appointment of Belgium's first female rabbi.

Incumbents
Monarch: Albert II
Prime Minister: Guy Verhofstadt

Events
 15 May – Club Brugge win the Belgian Pro League.
 1 June – Marcel Smets becomes the 2nd Vlaams Bouwmeester succeeding Bob van Reeth.
 6 July – The Flemish parliament approves a municipality decree, redefining the role and powers of local governments.
 11 September – Belgium gets its first female rabbi: Floriane Chinsky accepts her appointment in the new synagogue of Forest.
 28 September – Kenyan Samson Kosgei wins the Brussels Marathon in a time of 2:12.01.
 11 October – The Verhofstadt II Government proposes the Generatiepact to parliament. 
 26 November – The third Junior Eurovision Song Contest is held in Hasselt
 Undated
 Financial Intelligence & Processing firm is established.

Publications
 Sabine Dardenne, I Choose to Live (London, Virago Press)

Births
 4 October – Prince Emmanuel of Belgium 
 13 December
 Prince Aymeric of Belgium
 Prince Nicolas of Belgium

Deaths
 24 March – René Derolez (born 1921), philologist
 15 August – Adriaan Pattin (born 1914), historian of medieval philosophy

See also
2005 in Belgian television

References

 
Belgium